Introduction to Mathematical Philosophy is a book (1919 first edition) by philosopher Bertrand Russell, in which the author seeks to create an accessible introduction to various topics within the foundations of mathematics. According to the preface, the book is intended for those with only limited knowledge of mathematics and no prior experience with the mathematical logic it deals with. Accordingly, it is often used in introductory philosophy of mathematics courses at institutions of higher education.

Background 
Introduction to Mathematical Philosophy was written while Russell was serving time in Brixton Prison due to his anti-war activities.

Contents 
The book deals with a wide variety of topics within the philosophy of mathematics and mathematical logic including the logical basis and definition of natural numbers, real and complex numbers, limits and continuity, and classes.

Editions 
 Russell, Bertrand (1919), Introduction to Mathematical Philosophy, George Allen & Unwin. (Reprinted: Routledge, 1993.)
 Russell, Bertrand (1920), Introduction to Mathematical Philosophy, London: George Allen & Unwin / NY: Macmillan, Second Edition, reprintings 1920, 1924, 1930.

See also 
 Principia Mathematica
 The Principles of Mathematics
 Logicism

Footnotes 

Logic books
Books about philosophy of mathematics
Books by Bertrand Russell
1919 non-fiction books
Allen & Unwin books
Prison writings
Philosophy textbooks